Trevorton is a census-designated place (CDP) in Zerbe Township, Northumberland County, Pennsylvania, United States. The population was 1,834 at the 2010 census.

Geography
Trevorton is located at  (40.781510, -76.674259).

The community is located at the junction of Routes 225 and 890.

Demographics

As of the census of 2000, there were 2,010 people, 866 households, and 5690 families residing in the CDP. The population density was 470.2 people per square mile (181.3/km2). There were 931 housing units at an average density of 217.8/sq mi (84.0/km2). The racial makeup of the CDP was 98.71% White, 0.15% African American, 0.05% Native American, 0.15% Asian, 0.15% from other races, and 0.80% from two or more races. Hispanic or Latino of any race were 0.40% of the population.

There were 866 households, out of which 25.2% had children under the age of 18 living with them, 52.5% were married couples living together, 8.3% had a female householder with no husband present, and 35.3% were non-families. 31.6% of all households were made up of individuals, and 16.5% had someone living alone who was 65 years of age or older. The average household size was 2.32 and the average family size was 2.91.

In the CDP the population was spread out, with 21.1% under the age of 18, 7.1% from 18 to 24, 27.5% from 25 to 44, 23.9% from 45 to 64, and 20.4% who were 65 years of age or older. The median age was 42 years. For every 100 females there were 100.4 males. For every 100 females age 18 and over, there were 95.1 males.

The median income for a household in the CDP was $32,013, and the median income for a family was $38,143. Males had a median income of $30,236 versus $18,207 for females. The per capita income for the CDP was $15,781. About 6.0% of families and 8.6% of the population were below the poverty line, including 7.9% of those under age 18 and 13.5% of those age 65 or over.

References

External links

Doodlebug Park

Census-designated places in Northumberland County, Pennsylvania